Sir John de Grey (died 1266) was an English soldier and high sheriff.

John was the second son of Henry de Grey of Grays Thurrock in Essex. He served as High Sheriff of Bedfordshire and Buckinghamshire in 1238–39 and of High Sheriff of Herefordshire in 1252–53, undertaking military service in Flanders in 1232. He lived at Shirland in Derbyshire, married three times and his son, by his second wife, was Reginald de Grey, 1st Baron Grey de Wilton. He was accordingly an ancestor of many of the noble houses with the surname Grey. He died in March 1266.

References
Burke's Peerage and Baronetage (1939), s.v. Grey de Ruthyn

1266 deaths
13th-century English people
Medieval English knights
High Sheriffs of Bedfordshire
High Sheriffs of Buckinghamshire
High Sheriffs of Herefordshire
People from Shirland
People from Grays, Essex
John de Grey
Year of birth missing